Equatorius is an extinct  genus of kenyapithecine primate found in central Kenya at the Tugen Hills. Thirty-eight large teeth belonging to this middle Miocene hominid in addition to a mandibular and partially complete skeleton dated 15.58 Ma and 15.36 Ma. were later found.

Analysis
The anatomical structures in part was seen to be similar to Afropithecus and Proconsul. Nevertheless, anatomy and morphology  suggested the genus had an increased terrestrial habitat.

Taxonomy
, using their previous published study of K.africanus, based the separate definition on comparisons of gnathic and dental anatomy. The classification's validity was subsequently challenged.

Notes

References

 

Prehistoric apes
Miocene primates of Africa
Fossil taxa described in 1999
Prehistoric primate genera